Grzegorz Marek Poznański (born 9 March 1971, Warsaw) is a Polish career diplomat and civil service member, ambassador to Estonia (2010–2014), since 2020 Director General of the Permanent Secretariat of the Council of the Baltic Sea States (CBSS) in Stockholm.

Life 
Grzegorz Marek Poznański received a master's degree of international relations at the University of Warsaw. He has been studying also in Shanghai, Beijing, Taipei, National Defence University of Warsaw, National School of Public Administration, as well as United Nations Disarmament Fellowship course (2001).

He started his diplomatic career in 1997 at the Ministry of Foreign Affairs (MFA), specializing in security, disarmament, non-proliferation and arms export control issues. Between 2002 and 2006 he was working at the Permanent Mission of the Republic of Poland to the United Nations Office at Geneva. Next, was a member of the UNSG Panel of Governmental Experts on missiles (2007–2008). From 2007 to 2010 he was deputy director of the MFA European Policy Department and director of the Security Policy Department. Between 2010 and 2014 he served as Poland ambassador to Estonia. Following his post as a deputy director European Policy Department and, again, as director of Security Policy Department (2015–2017), he became deputy head of mission of the embassy in Vilnius, Lithuania. In June 2020 he Grzegorz Marek Poznański was appointed Director General of the Council of the Baltic Sea States Secretariat as of 1 September 2020. Before that, he coordinated the Polish presidency of the council (2015–2016).

He speaks English, Russian and Chinese.

Besides diplomatic career, Poznański is also a fencer (épée, foil), member of Legia Warsaw sport club. He has been co-founder of Polish Fencing Club in Warsaw.

Honours 

 Order of the Cross of Terra Mariana, 1st class (Estonia, 2014)
 Cross of Merit of the Ministry of Defense of Estonia

References 

1971 births
Ambassadors of Poland to Estonia
Living people
Diplomats from Warsaw
Polish male fencers
Recipients of the Order of the Cross of Terra Mariana, 1st Class
University of Warsaw alumni